Janq'u Jaqhi (Aymara janq'u white, jaqhi precipice, cliff, "white cliff", also spelled Jankho Jakke) is a mountain in the Bolivian Andes which reaches a height of approximately . It is located in the La Paz Department, Loayza Province, Luribay Municipality. It lies northeast of Jukumarini and southeast of Sawaya.

References 

Mountains of La Paz Department (Bolivia)